In mathematics, specifically order theory, a partially ordered set is chain-complete if every chain in it has a least upper bound. It is ω-complete when every increasing sequence of elements (a type of countable chain) has a least upper bound; the same notion can be extended to other cardinalities of chains.

Examples
Every complete lattice is chain-complete. Unlike complete lattices, chain-complete posets are relatively common. Examples include:

 The set of all linearly independent subsets of a vector space V, ordered by inclusion. 
 The set of all partial functions on a set, ordered by restriction.
 The set of all partial choice functions on a collection of non-empty sets, ordered by restriction.
 The set of all prime ideals of a ring, ordered by inclusion.
 The set of all consistent theories of a first-order language.

Properties
A poset is chain-complete if and only if it is a pointed dcpo. However, this equivalence requires the axiom of choice.

Zorn's lemma states that, if a poset has an upper bound for every chain, then it has a maximal element. Thus, it applies to chain-complete posets, but is more general in that it allows chains that have upper bounds but do not have least upper bounds.

Chain-complete posets also obey the Bourbaki–Witt theorem, a fixed point theorem stating that, if f is a function from a chain complete poset to itself with the property that f(x) ≥ x for all x, then f has a fixed point. This theorem, in turn, can be used to prove that Zorn's lemma is a consequence of the axiom of choice.

By analogy with the Dedekind–MacNeille completion of a partially ordered set, every partially ordered set can be extended uniquely to a minimal chain-complete poset.

See also
Completeness (order theory)

References

Order theory